Jabu Christopher Kubheka (1969 – 12 June 2017), was a South African actor and model. He is best known for the roles in the television serials such as; Yizo Yizo, Zone 14 and Vat 'n Sit.

Personal life
He was married to Cynthia Khumalo since 2010. The couple had more than ten children including Khanyisile Tshabalala. However, during his Memorial Service, her wife expressed that he fathered 24 children, where 10 more kids were introduced on that day.

He died on 12 June 2017 at the age of 48 after committing suicide by hanging in his home at Soshanguve, Pretoria. His funeral service was postponed due to a "massive" backlog in the Gauteng provincial forensic services. In his suicide note, he explained the reason behind his suicide as his wife's secret relationship.

Career
He started acting career in Soweto in Positive Creative Arts in Zola in late 1980s. In 1991, he made film debut with the role "Xabo" in the film Crazy Safari directed by Billy Chan. In 1999, Kubheka joined with the season one of SABC1 drama serial Yizo Yizo. In the serial, he played the role as "Gunman" for three seasons with popularity until 2004. Then in 2005, he joined with the SABC1 drama series Zone 14 and played the supportive role of "Bazooka Khumba". His role became very popular among the public, where he continued to play the role for four seasons until 2011.

In 2014, he made the supportive role "Skhumba", in the eKasi+ sitcom Van 'n Sit. Other than that, he made guest roles in the soapies and comedies such as Jacob's Cross, Zabalaza, A Place Called Home, Generations, Abo Mzala, and Ses'Top La. In 2016, he appeared in the SABC2 telenovela Keeping Score with the role "Smokes". Later in the year, he made his final television appearance with the role "Edison" in the season two of SABC1 comedy serial Thandeka's Diary. Few days before his death, he was auditioned for a role on Mzansi Magic drama series Ring of Lies.

Apart from that, he also had performed with a group called Team Four. The group included Innocent "Bobo" Masuku and Dumisani "Stix" Khumalo. He also announced about his intentions to release an album under Kalawa Jazmee.

Filmography

References

External links
 IMDb

1969 births
2017 deaths
South African male film actors
South African male television actors
Suicides by hanging in South Africa